Pteromicra is a genus of flies in the family Sciomyzidae, the marsh flies or snail-killing flies.

Species
P. angustipennis (Staeger, 1845)
P. glabricula (Fallén, 1820)
P. leucopeza (Meigen, 1838)
P. oldenbergi (Hendel, 1902)
P. pectorosa (Hendel, 1902)
P. zariae Knutson, Deeming & Ebejer, 2018

References

Sciomyzidae
Sciomyzoidea genera